This is a list of cathedrals in Burma sorted by denomination.

Roman Catholic
Cathedrals of the Roman Catholic Church in Burma:
 Cathedral of St. Patrick in Banmaw
 Cathedral of St. Joseph in Hakha
 Cathedral of St. Francis Xavier in Hpa-an
 Cathedral of St. Mary in Kalay
 Cathedral of the Immaculate Heart of Mary in Kengtung
 Cathedral of the Sacred Heart in Lashio
 Christ the King Cathedral in Loikaw
 Sacred Heart Cathedral in Mandalay
 Holy Family Cathedral in Mawlamyine
 St. Columban's Cathedral in Myitkyina
 St. Peter's Cathedral in Pathein
 Cathedral of the Sacred Heart of Jesus in Pekon
 St. Paul's Cathedral in Pyay
 St. Joseph's Cathedral in Taunggyi
 Cathedral of the Sacred Heart in Taungoo
 Cathedral of the Immaculate Conception in Yangon

Anglican

Cathedrals of the Church of the Province of Myanmar:
 St. Peter's Cathedral in Hpa-An
 Christ Church Cathedral in Mandalay
 Holy Trinity Cathedral in Yangon
 Christ the King Cathedral in  Myitkyina Diocese

See also
List of cathedrals
Christianity in Burma
St. Mark Cathedral in Sittwe Diocese

References

Cathedrals in Myanmar
Myanmar
Lists of religious buildings and structures in Myanmar
Cathedrals